The following highways are numbered 468:

Canada
Manitoba Provincial Road 468

Japan
 Japan National Route 468

United States
  Florida State Road 468 (former)
  Louisiana Highway 468
  Maryland Route 468
  Mississippi Highway 468
  Puerto Rico Highway 468
  Farm to Market Road 468